Periya Kalayamputhur is a panchayat village located in the Palani Block in Dindigul district of Tamil Nadu, India. It is situated 5 km from sub-district headquarter Palani and 60 km away from the district headquarter of Dindigul. The village covers an area of 1412.67 hectares and has a total population of 11,746, including 5,730 males and 6,016 females, according to 2011 census. There are about 3,171 houses in the village.

See also
 Dindigul

References

Cities and towns in Dindigul district